This page is a list of organisations of Tibetans in exile. Most of the organisations listed are groups of ethnic Tibetans outside of Tibet and based in Dharamsala. The Dharamshala Indian community materialised around the Dalai Lama, who moved there from Tibet after the 1959 unrest in Tibet. There are cultural groups, religious groups, and political groups, some of which promote the goals of the Tibetan independence movement.

Organisations of Tibetans in exile
Association of Tibetan Journalists, based in Dharamshala, India. 
Central Tibetan Administration, also referred to as the Tibetan Government in Exile. Tibet's democratically elected government based in Dharamshala, India. 
Chushi Gangdruk (Tibet's volunteer defender of Faith), was based in New York City, USA
Dalai Lama Center for Peace and Education
Empowering the Vision Project, based in New Delhi, India. 
Foundation for Universal Responsibility of His Holiness the Dalai Lama
International Tibet Support Network, based in   San Francisco, California, USA
 International Association of Tibetan Studies
Khawa Karpo-Tibet Culture Centre, based in Dharamshala in India. 
Lha Charitable Trust, Institute for Social Work and Education, based in Dharamshala in India. 
National Democratic Party of Tibet, based in Dharamshala in India. 
Norbulingka Institute
Offices of Tibet, official agencies of the 14th Dalai Lama and the Central Tibetan Administration based in Dharamsala, India.
Political Prisoners Movement of Tibet,  based in Oakland, California, USA
Tibetan Centre for Human Rights and Democracy
Tibetan Children's Villages,  based in Dharamshala in India. 
Tibetan Institute of Performing Arts
Tibet Justice Center,  based in Dharamshala in India. 
Tibet Religious Foundation of His Holiness the Dalai Lama
 Tibetan National Football Association
Tibetan Nuns Project, based in Seattle, USA and  Dharamshala, India.
Tibetan Volunteers for Animals, based near Camp 2, Lake Bylakuppe Tibetan Settlement Mysore, India.
Tibetan Women's Association,  based in Dharamshala in India. 
Tibetan Youth Congress, based in  Dharamsala, India.
Tibet Bureau in Geneva is the official representation of the 14th Dalai Lama and the Tibetan Government in Exile for Central and Eastern Europe.
Tibet Bureau (Paris)
Tibetan Centre for Human Rights and Democracy
Tibetan Children's Villages,  based in Dharamshala in India. 
Tibet Fund, the primary funding organisation for the health, education, refugee rehabilitation, cultural preservation and economic development programs that enable Tibetans in exile and in their homeland to sustain their language, culture and national identity, based in New York City, NY, United States.
Tibet Justice Center,  based in Dharamshala in India. 
Tibet Religious Foundation of His Holiness the Dalai Lama

Organisations linked to Tibetans in exile
 Australia Tibet Council
 Buddhist Digital Resource Center, formerly Tibetan Buddhist Resource Center. In cooperation with the Harvard University Open Access Project (HOAP), BDRC is making its entire library completely open access. It also coordinates internships with graduate students from Harvard Divinity School and the Department of South Asian Studies at Harvard.
 Drepung Loseling
 Free Tibet Campaign in London
 Foundation for the Preservation of the Mahayana Tradition
 Himalayan Art Resources
 International Campaign for Tibet
 Jewel Heart
 Journal of the International Association of Tibetan Studies
 Kopan Monastery
 Mind and Life Institute
 Nalanda Institute
 Rato Dratsang Foundation
 Rubin Museum of Art
 Social, Emotional, and Ethical Learning — SEE Learning 
 Students for a Free Tibet
 Tsadra Foundation
 Tibetan and Himalayan Library
 Tibet Center
 Tibet House worldwide
 Tibet House US
 Tibet Fund
 Trace Foundation

References

Tibetans in exile
Human rights organisations based in India
Organisations list
Exile
Tibetan diaspora in India